Hyposmocoma nohomaalewa is a species of moth of the family Cosmopterigidae. It is endemic to Kauai.

The wingspan is 5.6–6.6 mm for males and 4.6–5.7 mm for females.

The larvae live on or near the tips of smaller roots of fallen Metrosideros polymorpha trees that are suspended parallel to the ground and covered with lichen. They live in a larval case which has the form of a bag-shaped structure covered with minute particles of sand intricately woven with silk. In the wild, it is always densely covered in bright green powdery lichen.

Etymology
The specific name is derived from the Hawaiian, noho (meaning to sit) and ma‘alewa (meaning aerial root) and describes the unique and unusual larval behavior of this species.

References

nohomaalewa
Endemic moths of Hawaii
Biota of Kauai
Moths described in 2011